Darko Stanojević (born 12 April 1987) is a Serbian football defender who plays for Uzbekistani club Neftchi Fergana.

External links
 
 
 Darko Stanojević profile & stats srbijafudbal.com 

1986 births
Living people
Sportspeople from Loznica
Association football defenders
Serbian footballers
FK Loznica players
FK Mačva Šabac players
FK Čukarički players
FK Metalac Gornji Milanovac players
FK Srem players
FK Mash'al Mubarek players
FC AGMK players
FC Shurtan Guzar players
FK Radnik Bijeljina players
FK Novi Pazar players
Navbahor Namangan players
Surkhon Termez players
FK Neftchi Farg'ona players
Serbian First League players
Serbian SuperLiga players
Uzbekistan Super League players
Premier League of Bosnia and Herzegovina players
Serbian expatriate footballers
Expatriate footballers in Uzbekistan
Serbian expatriate sportspeople in Uzbekistan
Expatriate footballers in Bosnia and Herzegovina
Serbian expatriate sportspeople in Bosnia and Herzegovina